Alex Alphonso Wheatle MBE (born 3 January 1963) is a British novelist, who was sentenced to a term of imprisonment after the 1981 Brixton riot in London.

Biography
Born in 1963 in London to Jamaican parents, Wheatle spent much of his childhood in a Shirley Oaks Children's Home. At the age of 16, he was a founding member of the Crucial Rocker sound system; his DJ name was Yardman Irie. He wrote lyrics about everyday life in Brixton, south London. By 1980, Wheatle was living in a social services hostel in Brixton, and he participated in the 1981 Brixton riots and their aftermath. While serving his resulting sentence, he read authors such as Chester Himes, Richard Wright, C. L. R. James and John Steinbeck. Wheatle's cellmate, a Rastafari, was the one who encouraged Wheatle to start reading books and care about his education. He features aspects of his life in his books, such as East of Acre Lane characters Yardman Irie and Jah Nelson.

Wheatle has since spoken about the Brixton riots, most prominently in the 2006 BBC programme Battle for Brixton. His early books are based on his life in Brixton as a teenager and his time in social services' care.

He received the London Arts Board New Writers Award in 1999 for his debut novel Brixton Rock, which was later adapted for the stage and performed at the Young Vic in July 2010.

He wrote and performed Uprising, a one-man play based on his own life at Tara Arts Studios, Wandsworth, London. In 2011, he took Uprising on tour and performed it at the Writing On The Wall Festival, Liverpool, the Oxford Playhouse, the Marlowe Theatre, Canterbury, the Ilkley Playhouse and the Albany Theatre, Deptford. The play re-toured theatres and literature festivals in 2012, marking the 50th year of Jamaican Independence.

Wheatle lives in London. He is a member of English PEN, and he now visits various institutions facilitating creative writing classes and making speeches. He has also narrated an audio guide to the streets of Brixton.

Awards and honours
In the Queen's Birthday Honours 2008, Wheatle was awarded the MBE for services to literature.

His young-adult novel Liccle Bit was longlisted for the Carnegie Medal in 2016.

His 2016 book Crongton Knights won the 50th Guardian Children's Fiction Prize. S. F. Said, one of the judging panel, said of the book: "Wheatle's writing is poetic, rhythmic and unique, remaking the English language with tremendous verve. Though Crongton is his invention, it resonates with many urban situations, not only in Britain but around the world. Crongton Knights is a major novel from a major voice in British children's literature."

Wheatle's life story features in Alex Wheatle, the fourth film in Small Axe, a 2020 anthology of five films by Steve McQueen about the West Indian community in the UK during the 1970s and 1980s. Alex Wheatle depicts Wheatle's life up to and just after the Brixton uprising.

Bibliography
Brixton Rock (Black Amber, 1999)
East of Acre Lane (Fourth Estate, 2001)
The Seven Sisters (Fourth Estate, 2002)
Checkers (with Mark Parham; X-Press, 2003)
Island Songs (Allison & Busby, 2005)
The Dirty South (Serpent's Tail, 2008)
Brenton Brown (Arcadia Books, 2011)
Liccle Bit (Atom Books, 2015)
Crongton Knights (Atom Books, 2016)
Straight Outta Crongton (Atom Books, 2017)
Uprising (Spck Books, 2017)
Nicolas Cage  (Barrington Stoke, 2018)
Home Boys (Arcadia Books, 2018)
Home Girl (Little Brown, Akashic, Hachette UK, 2019)
Cane Warriors (Andersen Press, 2020)
Cringel (Pringles, 2020)
Kemosha of the Caribbean (Andersen Press, 2022)
 
Wheatle's books have also been translated into French, Italian, Urdu, Welsh, German, and Japanese.

References

External links

1963 births
Living people
20th-century English criminals
Black British writers
Criminals from London
Members of the Order of the British Empire
20th-century British novelists
21st-century British novelists
English people of Jamaican descent
British dramatists and playwrights
British male novelists
British male dramatists and playwrights
20th-century British male writers
21st-century British male writers
British children's writers
British writers of young adult literature
Guardian Children's Fiction Prize winners